East of Borneo is an online art publication which documents contemporary art and its history as considered from Los Angeles.  Partially funded and supported by the School of Art at the California Institute of the Arts, it was founded in 2010 by Thomas Lawson (artist and CalArts dean) and Stacey Allan.

In 2012, East of Borneo launched East of Borneo Books.  The first release was Piecing Together Los Angeles: An Esther McCoy Reader.   It was followed by Facing the Music: Documenting Walt Disney Concert Hall and The Redevelopment of Downtown Los Angeles, a project by Allan Sekula, and Second Life: Light Bulb (1977-81), edited by Chip Chapman.

References

External links 
Official website 
 East of Borneo Books

Online magazines published in the United States
Visual arts magazines published in the United States
Contemporary art magazines
Magazines established in 2010
Magazines published in California